Will Porter (born 14 December 1998) is an English professional rugby union player for Bristol Bears.

Career
Porter was born in Philadelphia. At the age of one he moved to England and attended Merchant Taylors' School. At the age of ten he began playing rugby at local club Amersham and Chiltern and later joined the academy of Wasps when he was fifteen.

In August 2017 Porter scored a try for England under-18 against France.

References

External links
Wasps Profile
ESPN Profile
Ultimate Rugby Profile

1998 births
Living people
American rugby union players
English rugby union players
Rugby union scrum-halves
Wasps RFC players
People educated at Merchant Taylors' School, Northwood